Siege of Negroponte can refer to one of two sieges of the town of Chalkis in Greece (medieval Negroponte):

 Siege of Negroponte (1257–58), 13-month siege of Negroponte by the Venetians and their allies
 Siege of Negroponte (1470) by the Ottoman Turks
 Siege of Negroponte (1688) by the Venetians

See also
 Siege of Euripos